Summer Skin is a 1961 Argentine film directed by Leopoldo Torre Nilsson. The film was selected as the Argentine entry for the Best Foreign Language Film at the 34th Academy Awards, but was not accepted as a nominee.

Cast
 Alfredo Alcón as Martín
 Graciela Borges as Marcela
 Franca Boni as Jou-Jou
 Pedro Laxalt as Alberto
 Juan Jones as Marcos
 Luciana Possamay as Adela

See also
 List of submissions to the 34th Academy Awards for Best Foreign Language Film
 List of Argentine submissions for the Academy Award for Best Foreign Language Film

References

External links
 

1961 films
1961 drama films
1960s Spanish-language films
Argentine black-and-white films
Films directed by Leopoldo Torre Nilsson
Argentine drama films
1960s Argentine films